John Wilbur Dwight (May 24, 1859 – January 28, 1928) was a U.S. political figure. He served as a member of the United States House of Representatives from New York from 1902 to 1913. He also served as House majority whip between 1909 and 1911. He then became House minority whip from 1911 to 1913.

Dwight was born May 24, 1859, in Dryden, New York. His father, Jeremiah Wilbur Dwight  (1819–1885), was a prominent politician and businessman in New York of the New England Dwight family. His mother was Rebecca Anne Cady. After his retirement from Congress, John Dwight continued to live in Washington, D.C. and died there. He served as President of the Virginia Blue Ridge Railway from 1913 to 1928. Dwight was a member of the Republican Party.

External links

1859 births
1928 deaths
People from Dryden, New York
Washington, D.C., Republicans
Republican Party members of the United States House of Representatives from New York (state)